An ice pier or ice wharf is a man-made structure used to assist the unloading of ships in Antarctica. It is constructed by pumping seawater into a contained area and allowing the water to freeze. By repeating this procedure several times, additional layers are built up. The final structure is many metres in thickness, and strong enough to support container trucks. Operation Deep Freeze personnel constructed the first floating ice pier at Antarctica’s southernmost sea port at McMurdo Station in 1973. The harbor is positioned on the southern tip of Ross Island.

Historically, two supply ships, a freighter and a tanker, arrive at the ice pier each summer, after an icebreaker opens a ship channel through pack ice. The ice pier's key function is to provide a platform for freight trucks to come alongside a supply ship to receive or offload cargo. Steel cables attached to shoreline hold the dock in a fixed position.

Port officials distribute freight arriving at the dock to McMurdo Station, nearby Scott Base, and to field camps as far away as the South Pole. Imports include virtually any materials needed to support personnel living and working in Antarctica. Exports range from items such as scientific ice core samples and human waste collected from field camps to broken equipment and recyclables for return to the United States for processing.

Ice piers typically have a lifespan of three to five years. Once an ice pier is no longer usable, icebreakers tow the pier to sea to be cast adrift.

Annual break-in opens ship channel
Ships docking at the McMurdo Station ice pier rely upon icebreakers opening a ship channel from Upper McMurdo Sound to Winter Quarters Bay.

The ice buildup occurred when a 100-mile-long iceberg (B15A) ran aground near Upper McMurdo Sound. Two icebreakers eventually broke a ship channel through to Winter Quarters Bay.

The ship channel provides a seaway for the few annual re-supply vessels and research ships which call upon the extraordinarily remote seaport at McMurdo Station. Preparation for the supply ships’ arrival includes icebreakers maintaining a uniform edge on the seaward side of the pier. The ship's skipper maneuvers the icebreaker to use its bow as a giant battering ram to scarf or shave jagged edges from the pier to facilitate ships tying up at the dock.

Ice pier expedites shipping
U.S. ships discharged cargo at temporary iceports in McMurdo Sound prior to the military's invention of the ice pier. Ships during that time moored alongside seasonal pack ice where military longshoremen offloaded cargo onto large snow sleds. Equipment operators then used snow cats and tractors to tow the freight over ice to McMurdo, a difficult and potentially dangerous operation.

Beginning in 1964, icebreakers started opening a ship channel to Winter Quarters Bay where ships tied off to fast ice, a form of sea ice attached to the coast or ice wall such as Antarctica's Ross Ice Shelf. However, mooring to fast ice produced undesirable results. Warm water discharged from ships eroded ice at the rate of some three square kilometres every year.

Consequently, port authorities built a steel dock in 1972, which waves from a storm destroyed soon after. Builders came up with an alternative that same season. They constructed a block of ice, covered it with matting and straw and used it as a fender for a tanker that docked at the harbor in fall 1973. The ice fender became the forerunner to the contemporary ice pier.

McMurdo's dock is not without comparison. In 1987 workers constructed a similar pier in Mys Shmidta, a small seaport located in Chukotka, a far-eastern territory adjacent to Alaska on the Arctic Sea. And, like McMurdo, the Arctic ice pier facilitated getting ships to get closer to shore for loading cargo. The pier built in the former Soviet Union measured more than 700 metres long.

Seawater construction
 The ice piers deployed at McMurdo Station have grown in sophistication and size since the ice fender prototype. Fleet operations personnel make the floating pier during the winter.

Subsequently, workers construct a snow berm to a depth of several feet along the perimeter of the soon-to-be ice pier. The seawater typically freezes solid within 24 hours.

Wooden utility poles drilled about four deep into the final ice pier support electrical and telephone service to the pier. Moreover, during the final construction phase, personnel mount shorter poles in the ice edge to serve as bollards to secure the pier to the shore at McMurdo. A  layer of volcanic gravel tops off the pier to provide a non-slip surface and to insulate the ice from the summer sun.

Experience has shown that ice piers have a lifespan of three to five years. Factors such as stress cracking and erosion shorten the duration. In addition, storm surges, wave action, contact with vessels, and the warm water discharge from ships contribute to degradation of the pier's seaward edge.

Ice pier limits discovered
 Ice pier operations at the world's most southern port have not been without mishap. The principal threat is onshore winds with accompanying high seas and ocean swells, which can severely damage the ice pier. For example, in 1993, high winds and heavy swells caused major cracks in the wharf. Rough seas produced movements of several feet between individual sections of the pier, according to a National Science Foundation (NSF) report. The resulting damage prevented vehicles from traveling onto the pier for repairs.

Conditions worsened the following week when additional storms pushed ice, slush, and sea water onto the pier, flooding about one-half of the dock. The inundation on the pier's seaward side reached three to six-feet high and froze nearly immediately, according to the NSF report. The strategy to repair the storm damage included adding additional restraining cables followed by routine flooding to build up the ice thickness.

Notable incidents with damaged ice piers at McMurdo Station include an event 10 years earlier. The ice pier had been in use four seasons in 1983 when the freighter USNS Southern Cross docked at Winter Quarters Bay. Operation Deep Freeze officials pressed the pier into extended service in order for the freighter to make an unprecedented two supply runs in one season from Port Lyttelton, New Zealand, to McMurdo. However, efforts to extend the ice pier's lifespan resulted in a cargo truck breaking through the ice. The driver of the truck standing atop the container leapt to safety, receiving minor injuries.

The most recent incident in 2010 occurred when a 10-year storm blew in causing white cap waves to wash the pier out to sea. It was assumed to be lost with the Jamesway hut, telephone pole, bollards, and other equipment still on it. Found during the austral summer in 2011, the equipment was ferried by helicopter back to McMurdo. A tracking beacon was left on the Ice Pier as it drifted out to sea.

Maintenance gives way to disposal
Maintenance on the ice pier begins at the end of the austral summer. Equipment operators remove the gravel and store it for the next season. Removing the gravel prevents the gravel's insulating qualities from inhibiting further thickening of the ice during winter. Winter operations include plowing insulating snow from the dock and flooding the pier with seawater to help sustain the ice strength.

However, when the pier is no longer usable, a permit from the Antarctic Conservation Act allows for an icebreaker to tow the ice pier out to McMurdo Sound and cast it adrift. Preparations for dumping include:
 Pumice surface is removed
 Wooden poles are cut off just above the surface of the ice
 All equipment, materials, and debris are removed

After release at sea, currents and southerly winds drive the ice pier north towards the Ross Sea and into the circumpolar currents of the Southern Ocean. A beacon mounted on the pier allows for tracking and serves as a warning to ships. The pier mixes with pack ice and eventually melts, a process that can take years, according to NSF estimates.

U.S. government reports vary regarding the fate of the untreated wooden bollards used in the ice pier. The wood in some instances is reported as weighted so as to sink. Yet a 1999 ocean dumping permit notes that: "the short lengths of wooden poles will float in the ocean for several months before becoming waterlogged and eventually sinking to the ocean floor."

See also

Icebreaker
Iceport
Ice road
McMurdo Sound
McMurdo Station
Operation Deep Freeze
Sea ice
Scott Base
Winter Quarters Bay

Notes

References
Antarctic Sun.
Federal Register Environmental Documents
The Press; Christchurch, New Zealand.
Seattle Post-Intelligencer.
USA Today

Transport in Antarctica
Ross Island
Piers
Pier
Pier
Buildings and structures made of snow or ice